The Light, the Dark and the Endless Knot is the second studio album by the Northern Irish Celtic metal band Waylander. It was released in 2001.

Track listing

Band line-up
Ciaran O'Hagan - vocals
Dermot O'Hagan - guitars
Peter Boylan - guitars
Mairtin MacCormaic - tin whistle
Michael Proctor - bass
Bo Murphy - drums

Waylander (band) albums
Pagan metal albums
2001 albums